O. polymorpha may refer to:

 Ogataea polymorpha, a methylotrophic yeast
 Olethreutes polymorpha, a tortrix moth